Nadezhda Vasilyevna Rykalova (10 July 1824 – 3 January 1914) was a Russian stage actress, best known for her Maly Theatre performances in plays by Alexander Ostrovsky, who created the Kabanikha character (in The Storm) especially for her.

Rykalova was born in Moscow, then in the Russian Empire. She came from an artistic family and had the famous Russian tragic Mikhail Shchepkin as a mentor. She played more than 400 roles on stage and retired in 1907. She died in Moscow, aged 89.

References 

Russian stage actresses
1824 births
1914 deaths
19th-century actresses from the Russian Empire